Kepler-444 (or KOI-3158, KIC 6278762, 2MASS J19190052+4138043, BD+41°3306) is a triple star system, estimated to be 11.2 billion years old (more than 80% of the age of the universe), approximately  away from Earth in the constellation Lyra. On 27 January 2015, the Kepler spacecraft is reported to have confirmed the detection of five sub-Earth-sized rocky exoplanets orbiting the main star. The star is a K-type main sequence star. All of the planets are far too close to their star to harbour life forms.

Discovery
Preliminary results of the planetary system around Kepler-444 were first announced at the second Kepler Science Conference in 2013. At that conference, the star was known as KOI-3158.

Characteristics
The star, Kepler-444, is approximately 11.2 billion years old, whereas the Sun is only 4.6 billion years old. The age is that of Kepler-444 A, an orange main sequence star of spectral type K0. Despite this great age, it is in middle of its main-sequence lifespan, much like the Sun.

The original research on Kepler-444 was published in The Astrophysical Journal on 27 January 2015 under the title "An ancient extrasolar system with five sub-Earth-size planets" by a team of 40 authors, the abstract reads as follows:

The chemical composition of stars hosting small exoplanets (with radii less than four Earth radii) appears to be more diverse than that of gas-giant hosts, which tend to be metal-rich. This implies that small, including Earth-size, planets may have readily formed at earlier epochs in the Universe's history when metals were more scarce. We report Kepler spacecraft observations of Kepler-444, a metal-poor Sun-like star from the old population of the Galactic thick disk and the host to a compact system of five transiting planets with sizes between those of Mercury and Venus. We validate this system as a true five-planet system orbiting the target star and provide a detailed characterization of its planetary and orbital parameters based on an analysis of the transit photometry. Kepler-444 is the densest star with detected solar-like oscillations. We use asteroseismology to directly measure a precise age of 11.2+/-1.0 Gyr for the host star, indicating that Kepler-444 formed when the Universe was less than 20% of its current age and making it the oldest known system of terrestrial-size planets. We thus show that Earth-size planets have formed throughout most of the Universe's 13.8-billion-year history, leaving open the possibility for the existence of ancient life in the Galaxy. The age of Kepler-444 not only suggests that thick-disk stars were among the hosts to the first Galactic planets, but may also help to pinpoint the beginning of the era of planet formation." The star is believed to have 2 M dwarfs in orbit around it with the fainter companion 1.8 arc-seconds from the main star.

Stellar system
The Kepler-444 system consists of the planet hosting primary and a pair of M-dwarf stars. The M-dwarfs orbit each other at a distance of less than 0.3 AU while the pair orbits the primary in a highly eccentric 324-year orbit. The pair comes within 23.55 AU of the primary potentially truncating the protoplanetary disk from which the planets formed at 8 AU. This would have depleted the availability of solid material to form the observed planets.

Previous stellar orbit solution was ever more extreme, period was shorter (211 years) and eccentricity was much larger (e=0.865), moving periastron to 5 AU, severely reducing the estimated protoplanetary disk size to 1–2 AU and its estimated mass from 600 to 4 Earth masses.

Planetary system
All five rocky exoplanets (Kepler-444b; Kepler-444c; Kepler-444d; Kepler-444e; Kepler-444f) are confirmed, smaller than the size of Venus (but bigger than Mercury) and each of the exoplanets completes an orbit around the host star in less than 10 days. Thus, the planetary system is very compact, as even the furthest known planet, Kepler-444f, still orbits closer to the star than Mercury is to the Sun. According to NASA, no life as we know it could exist on these hot exoplanets, due to their close orbital distances to the host star. To keep the known planetary system stable, no additional giant planets can be located within 5.5 AU of the parent star.

Moreover, the system is pervaded by high-order resonance chain: period ratios are 4:5, 3:4, 4:5, 4:5. This tight chain is unperturbed and very likely continues farther from Kepler-444A.

See also
 Kepler-80 - most compact 5-planet system discovered so far
 List of extrasolar planets
 PSR B1620-26 - an ancient planetary system in Messier 4

References

External links
 NASA – Kepler-444/KOI-3158 at The NASA Exoplanet Archive
 NASA – Kepler-444b/c/d/e/f at Extrasolar Planets Encyclopaedia

Lyra (constellation)
Planetary systems with five confirmed planets
K-type main-sequence stars
3158
Planetary transit variables
J19190052+4138043
94931
Durchmusterung objects
M-type main-sequence stars
Triple star systems
TIC objects